Curtis Michael Casali (born November 9, 1988), is an American professional baseball catcher for the Cincinnati Reds of Major League Baseball (MLB). He played college baseball at Vanderbilt University, and was selected in the 10th round of the 2011 MLB draft by the Detroit Tigers. He made his MLB debut in 2014 with the Tampa Bay Rays, and has also played for the San Francisco Giants, and Seattle Mariners.

Amateur career
Casali was born in Walnut Creek, California, but raised in New Canaan, Connecticut. He attended New Canaan High School. He starred in baseball (batting .427 for the team) as well as basketball, and in football as a quarterback, leading the team to a state championship. Casali earned first-team All-State honors in football and baseball, and was named the second-best prospect from Connecticut/Rhode Island in the June 2007 baseball draft.

Casali played college baseball at Vanderbilt University. During his four years at Vanderbilt, he had a .316 batting average, a .430 on-base percentage, a .502 slugging percentage, 27 home runs, and 167 runs batted in (RBIs). Casali made it to the College World Series semifinals in 2011 with Vanderbilt, but the team was eliminated by Florida. In 2008, he played collegiate summer baseball with the Hyannis Mets of the Cape Cod Baseball League, and he returned to the league in 2010 to play for the Cotuit Kettleers.

Professional career

Detroit Tigers

The Detroit Tigers selected Casali in the 10th round of the 2011 Major League Baseball draft, 317th overall, and he signed on July 1, 2011, for a $40,000 signing bonus. Baseball America''' wrote that the Tommy John surgery that he had in 2009 while in college reduced his formerly plus arm strength, but that he was still a good defensive catcher with a good approach at the plate.  He made his professional debut that season for the short season Class A- Connecticut Tigers of the New York-Pennsylvania League, batting .278/.409/.417 with one home run and two RBIs in 26 at bats. He then played for the Class A West Michigan Whitecaps of the Midwest League, batting .227/.344/.400 with 2 home runs and 14 RBIs in 75 at bats. Between the two teams, he had a low strikeout rate, at 10.3%.

In 2012 he played for West Michigan and, starting in late June, the Class A+ Lakeland Flying Tigers. Casali batted a combined .270/.365/.427 with 9 home runs and 43 RBIs in 330 at bats. He helped the Flying Tigers to their first Florida State League title in 20 years.  He was a 2012 MiLB Organization All Star. Baseball America'' ranked him as the organization's 23rd-best prospect.

Tampa Bay Rays
On March 25, 2013, the Tigers traded Casali to the Tampa Bay Rays for pitcher Kyle Lobstein. The Rays assigned him to the Class A+ Charlotte Stone Crabs, and then promoted him to the Class AA Montgomery Biscuits. With Charlotte, he batted .267/.342/.406 in 165 at bats and was an FSL Mid-Season All-Star. In 35 games with Montgomery, Casali hit .383 with a .483 on-base percentage and .600 slugging percentage, with five home runs. Overall, he hit .317/.405/.489 and 10 home runs. He was a 2013 MiLB Organization All Star. 

In 2014, he was invited to spring training by the Rays. Casali returned to Montgomery to start the 2014 season, and batted .314/.500/.429 in 70 at bats. He was promoted to the Class AAA Durham Bulls in May, and for them he batted .237/.335/.359 in 156 at bats.

On July 18, 2014, Casali played his first major league game against the Minnesota Twins. He recorded a hit in his first at bat and a run later in the inning. He batted .167 in 72 at bats.

On July 28, 2015, Casali hit two home runs in one game against the Detroit Tigers. One night later, Casali repeated the feat by hitting two homers against former teammate and fellow Vanderbilt alum David Price. In 2015 with Tampa Bay he batted .238/.304/.594 with a career-high 10 home runs and 18 RBIs in 101 at bats. With Durham, he batted .205/.326/.348 in 112 at bats.

Casali opened the 2016 season in a platoon with Hank Conger. For Tampa Bay, he caught 36% of attempted basestealers, giving up 25 steals and catching 14 baserunners.  Casali hit .169 before being optioned to the Durham Bulls on August 4, 2016, for whom he batted .254/.407/.365 in 63 at bats. 

He played most of 2017 for Durham, batting .263/.351/.347 in 300 at bats.  In nine at bats for Tampa Bay, Casali had three hits, including a home run. He was outrighted to Triple-A on November 6, 2017, and elected free agency later that day.

Los Angeles Angels
On November 28, 2017, the Los Angeles Angels signed Casali to a minor league contract. However, the Angels released him on January 16, 2018.

Texas Rangers
Two days later he signed a minor league contract with the Texas Rangers. The Rangers released Casali on March 21, 2018.

Second stint with Rays
On March 21, 2018, Casali signed a minor league deal with the Tampa Bay Rays. Playing for Durham, he hit .274/.327/.453 in 95 at bats.

Cincinnati Reds
On May 31, 2018, Casali was traded to the Cincinnati Reds for cash. In July he injured his right knee, and was expected to be sidelined for three to four weeks. In 2018, he batted .293/.355/.450 with 4 home runs and 16 RBIs in 140 at bats.

In 2019, he batted .251/.331/.411 with 8 home runs and a career-high 32 RBIs in 207 at bats. He had the best range factor/9 innings in the National League among catchers (10.76). Casali also had 14 at bats with the Class AAA Louisville Bats.

In 2020, he batted .224/.366/.500 with 6 home runs and 8 RBIs in 76 at bats. He had the 3rd-best range factor/9 innings in the National League among catchers (11.30). On December 2, 2020, Casali was nontendered by the Reds.

San Francisco Giants
On January 4, 2021, Casali signed a one-year, $1.5 million contract with the San Francisco Giants, to serve as the primary backup to catcher Buster Posey. During April 2021, Casali caught team shutouts in five consecutive starts (non-consecutive games). He became just the fifth catcher since 1900 with at least five straight team shutouts in his starts, and the first to do so with five different starting pitchers. On June 17, in a game against the Arizona Diamondbacks, Casali recorded his first career triple off of D’Backs reliever Riley Smith. In the game, Casali also notched his first Giants homer, a 2-run shot off of D’Backs starter Zac Gallen in a game in which he went 3-for-5 with 4 RBIs.

In the 2021 regular season, Casali batted .210/.313/.350 with 11 doubles and 26 walks (career highs), and 5 home runs and 26 RBIs in 200 at bats over 77 games.

On March 22, 2022, Casali signed a $2.6 million contract with the Giants, avoiding salary arbitration.

Seattle Mariners
On August 2, 2022, Casali and Matthew Boyd were traded to the Seattle Mariners in exchange for Michael Stryffeler and Andy Thomas.

Cincinnati Reds (second stint)
On December 22, 2022, Casali signed a one-year, $3.25 million contract with the Cincinnati Reds.

Records
 Giants franchise record for consecutive shutouts caught: 5
 MLB record (tie) for consecutive shutouts caught in the live-ball era: 5
 Second all-time (tie) for MLB modern era consecutive shutouts caught: 5 (record is 6)

See also
List of baseball players who underwent Tommy John surgery

References

External links

Vanderbilt Commodores bio

1988 births
Living people
Sportspeople from Walnut Creek, California
Baseball players from California
Major League Baseball catchers
Tampa Bay Rays players
Cincinnati Reds players
San Francisco Giants players
Seattle Mariners players
Vanderbilt Commodores baseball players
Cotuit Kettleers players
Hyannis Harbor Hawks players
Connecticut Tigers players
West Michigan Whitecaps players
Lakeland Flying Tigers players
Charlotte Stone Crabs players
Montgomery Biscuits players
Durham Bulls players
Salt River Rafters players
Louisville Bats players
Sacramento River Cats players
Tacoma Rainiers players